Flavenol is a misspelling of either of one of two different groups of chemicals that occur naturally in some plants:

Flavonols
Flavanols